Vallvik is a locality situated in Söderhamn Municipality, Gävleborg County, Sweden with 258 inhabitants in 2010.

History

Vallvik mill was built in 1907 and is a sulphate pulp mill belonging to Rottneros AB.

Demographics

Community
In the community there are old construction villages that were designed by Torben Grut. Vallvik, located at the so-called Virgin coast(named after the Virgin Queen), has a campsite and swimming beach with beach volleyball.

References

Populated places in Söderhamn Municipality
Hälsingland